The European Respiratory Journal is a monthly peer-reviewed medical journal covering respirology. It was established in 1988 and is published by the European Respiratory Society, of which it is the official journal. The editor-in-chief is James D. Chalmers (University of Dundee). According to the Journal Citation Reports, the journal had a 2021 impact factor of 33.795.

References

External links

Academic journals associated with international learned and professional societies of Europe
Pulmonology journals
Monthly journals
Publications established in 1988
English-language journals
Academic journals published by learned and professional societies